, (born Yamaguchi, July 8, 1963), is a former Japanese rugby union player. He played as a flanker.

Career
He first played for the Otsu High School, and then for Meiji University. At the 22nd National College Rugby Football Championship in 1985, while having drawn 12–12 with Keio University, he experienced the first victory of the team in 4 years. After that, Nakashima joined NEC (later NEC Green Rockets). On May 28, 1989, at Chichibunomiya Rugby Stadium, Tokyo, he debuted against Scotland, earning his first cap for the Japan national rugby union team. He contributed to Japan's first victory showing success throughout the match, later he was given the MVP grade and was praised by the then head coach of Japan, Hiroaki Shukuzawa. After that, as the player number 7, he got a chance to participate regularly in the 1991 Rugby World Cup until the match against Scotland, at Murrayfield. After his retirement as player, Nakashima was still in the Japan national team, as forwards coach between 1999 and 2003.

Personal life
His son, Tsubasa Nakashima, plays rugby for Waseda University since 2013. In 2017, he is a member of East Coast Bays Rugby football club in Auckland, New Zealand.

Notes

External links

1963 births
Living people
Japanese rugby union players
Rugby union flankers
Japan international rugby union players
Expatriate rugby union players in New Zealand
Japanese expatriate sportspeople in New Zealand
People from Yamaguchi Prefecture
Green Rockets Tokatsu players